Matilde Asensi Carratalá (born 1962) is a Spanish journalist and writer, specialised mainly in historical novels.

Biography
Asensi was born at Alicante.

She studied journalism at the Autonomous University of Barcelona, and she later worked for three years in the service of news of Radio Alicante-SER and Radio Nacional de España (RNE, Spanish National Radio) as the person in charge  of local and provincial news. She was also correspondent for Agencia EFE and provincial contributor in the newspapers La Verdad and Información.

Works
"Martín Ojo de Plata" trilogy:
 2007: Tierra firme
 2010: Venganza en Sevilla
 2012: La conjura de Cortés
 2013: Martin ojo de plata (compilation)

Cato series:
 2001: El último Catón (translated into English, 2006, as "The Last Cato" by Pamela Carmell)
 2015: El Regreso del Catón

Other works:
 1999: El salón de ámbar
 2000: Iacobus
 2003: El origen perdido
 2004: Peregrinatio
 2006: Todo bajo el cielo
 2019: Sakura (La Esfera de los Libros, 2019)

References

External links
  Official website 

1962 births
Living people
People from Alicante
Writers from the Valencian Community
20th-century Spanish novelists
21st-century Spanish novelists
Spanish historical novelists
Autonomous University of Barcelona alumni
Spanish women novelists
Spanish women journalists
20th-century Spanish women writers
21st-century Spanish women writers
Women historical novelists
20th-century Spanish journalists
21st-century Spanish journalists